New Koilwar Bridge, (officially Vashishtha Narayan Setu) at Koilwar in Bhojpur is a 1.52 km long, 6-lane wide road bridge over the Sone river. It connects Arrah with Patna, the capital of Bihar state in India and also carries Buxar-Arrah-Patna national highway (NH-922). New Koilwar Bridge is named after Indian mathematician and Padma Shri awardee Vashishtha Narayan Singh (1946-2019). New Koilwar Bridge is 500 metres north and parallel to the existing 2-lane wide Koilwar Bridge. The construction work of all 6-lanes completed and Bridge is fully opened to public on 14 May 2022.

In December 2020, Government of India has approved a 4-lane wide elevated road from Bharauli near Buxar of Bihar to Haydaria in Ghazipur of Uttar Pradesh. Upon its completion, Patna will be connected with Lucknow via New Koilwar bridge, Buxar-Ghazipur elevated road and the Purvanchal Expressway.

History
The Koilwar Bridge, a 2-lane wide road-cum-rail bridge was built by East Indian Railway Company and became operational on 4 November 1862. Since it was narrow and getting older there was a huge traffic movement problem, there was a need for an alternate road bridge to solve this issue. After 158 years, on 10 December 2020 Nitin Gadkari the Union Minister of Road Transport and Highways inaugurated the New Koilwar Bridge via video-conferencing from New Delhi.

Delhi-Patna connectivity
The 6-lane New Koilwar Bridge is a part of Government of India's initiative to connect New Delhi with Patna (via Lucknow) in order to improve transportation facilities and trade & commerce activities in the state of Bihar. New Delhi is already connected to Ghazipur in Uttar Pradesh by various expressways and upon the completion of 'Buxar-Ghazipur elevated road', people can travel till Patna in Bihar by Buxar-Arrah-Patna national highway (NH-922).

Road network

List of expressways and highways connecting New Delhi with Agra, Lucknow and Patna.

Note: Union Minister Nitin Gadkari announced on 28 August 2021 that the Government of India will construct Ghazipur–Arrah–Patna Expressway at an event in Arrah, Bihar.

Status updates
 July 2017: Foundation stone ceremony of New Koilwar Bridge done by Union Minister R. K. Singh on 22 July 2017.
 Jan 2018: The construction work of Bridge started by SP Singla Constructions Pvt Ltd.
 Dec 2020: 3-lanes (Patna to Arrah) opened for traffic to public and inaugurated on 10 December 2020 by Union Minister Nitin Gadkari.
 May 2022: The other 3-lanes (Arrah to Patna) opened to public on 14 May 2022. Inauguration done by Union Minister Nitin Gadkari.

See also
 Koilwar Bridge
 Arrah-Chhapra Bridge

References

Bridges in Bihar
Bhojpur district, India